Millard Bloomer (June 10, 1899 – July 2, 1974) was an American fencer. He competed in the individual foil event at the 1920 Summer Olympics.

References

External links
 

1899 births
1974 deaths
American male foil fencers
Olympic fencers of the United States
Fencers at the 1920 Summer Olympics
Sportspeople from New York City